Re TransBus International Ltd [2004] EWHC 932 (Ch) is a UK insolvency law case, concerning the discretion of an administrator to trade with a company's assets.

Facts
The administrators of TransBus International Ltd applied to the court under IA 1986 Sch B1, para 63 for directions about whether or not they could effect a sale of the business.

Judgment
Lawrence Collins J held the administrator can act without creditor approval or court approval, if he thinks it in the best interest of creditors.

See also

UK insolvency law

Notes

References

United Kingdom insolvency case law
2004 in British law
2004 in case law
High Court of Justice cases